This is a of serving senior officers in the Royal Air Force. It includes currently serving air chief marshals, air marshals, air vice-marshals, and air commodores.

Air Chief Marshals

Air Marshals

Air Vice-Marshals

Acting

Air Commodores

Acting

See also
 List of serving senior officers of the Royal Navy
 List of serving senior officers of the Royal Marines
 List of serving senior officers of the British Army

References

External links
 RAF Senior Appointments

 
 *
Lists of British military personnel
Royal Air Force